Belmont is a settlement and ferry terminal in southern Unst in the Shetland Islands. The ferry crosses from here to Gutcher in Yell and to Hamars Ness in Fetlar.

Belmont House, a Georgian mansion built in 1775 by Thomas Mouat, was restored by Historic Scotland amongst others, and opened to the public in 2011.

References

External links

 Belmont House

Villages in Unst